The 2017 Booker Prize for Fiction was awarded at a ceremony on 17 October 2017. The Man Booker dozen of 13 books was announced on 27 July, narrowed down to a shortlist of six titles on 13 September. George Saunders was awarded the 2017 Booker Prize for his novel Lincoln in the Bardo, receiving £50,000 (~$65,000), and becoming the second American author in a row to be awarded the prize.

Judging panel
Lola, Baroness Young
 Lila Azam Zanganeh
 Sarah Hall
 Colin Thubron
 Tom Phillips

Nominees

Shortlist

Longlist

See also
 List of winners and shortlisted authors of the Booker Prize

References

Man Booker
Booker Prizes by year
2017 awards in the United Kingdom